Saint Vincent's School for Boys was founded as an orphanage in 1855 by the Daughters of Charity of Saint Vincent de Paul. It has been maintained and enlarged by subsequent bishops of San Francisco. It is now a licensed 52-bed Short Term Residential Therapy Program (STRTP) serving boys age 7 to 18, who are referred from county public health agencies and in-patient psychiatric hospitals throughout Northern California. It is located near the city of San Rafael in Marin County, California. It is one of the oldest institutions west of the Mississippi dedicated exclusively to therapeutic and compassionate care of traumatized boys, and was recognized as a California State Historical Landmark in 1958.

The Saint Vincent Station, a nearby railroad stop on the Northwestern Pacific Railroad, was named after the school, as was the Saint Vincent post office that operated there from 1896 to 1922.

References

Further reading

California Historical Landmarks